Paul Bacon (1 November 1907 – 6 December 1999) was a French politician.

Biography 
Bacon was born in Paris. During World War II, he was active in the French Resistance. He was a member of Georges Bidault's National Liberation Movement, and distributed a manifesto about trade unionism in December 1940. Bacon was arrested by the Gestapo in 1943.

After the war, Bacon continued his political career. A member of the Christian Democratic Popular Republican Movement (MRP), he was Member of the two National Constituent Assemblies (1945–46) and then of the National Assembly from 1946 to 1958 representing the Seine Department. He was Secretary of state in the prime minister's office in 1959-1960, Minister of Labour and Social security (with some interruptions during the cabinets of Pinay and of Mendès France) from 1950 to 1956 and again in 1957-1959. 

He was Minister of Labour in De Gaulle, Debré and Pompidou governments from 1958 to 1962. With the other MRP ministers, he resigned in protest after De Gaulle's press conference about European integration in May 1962. He sat in the Economic and Social Council from 1962 to 1964. Bacon was also a municipal councillor at Saint-Maur-des-Fossés.

A trade unionist and an adept of social harmony, Paul Bacon was one of the major figures who built French social security and was the father of the Interprofessional Guaranteed Minimum Wage (salaire minimum interprofessionnel garanti, or SMIG).

Books 
Bacon wrote several books:
 La Naissance de la classe ouvrière
 Vers la réforme de l'entreprise capitaliste
 Vers la démocratie économique et sociale

References 

1907 births
1999 deaths
Deputies of the 1st National Assembly of the French Fourth Republic
Deputies of the 2nd National Assembly of the French Fourth Republic
Deputies of the 3rd National Assembly of the French Fourth Republic
French Resistance members
French people of the Algerian War
Government ministers of France
Members of the Constituent Assembly of France (1945)
Members of the Constituent Assembly of France (1946)
Politicians from Paris
Popular Republican Movement politicians